The Secret Ways is a 1961 American neo noir mystery thriller film based on Alistair MacLean's 1959 novel The Last Frontier. It was directed by Phil Karlson and stars Richard Widmark.

Plot
In 1960 Vienna, after Soviet tanks crush the Hungarian Revolution of 1956, American adventurer Michael Reynolds (Richard Widmark) is hired by an international espionage ring to smuggle a noted scholar and resistance leader, Professor Jansci (Walter Rilla), out of Communist-ruled Hungary. Reynolds goes to Vienna to see the professor's daughter, Julia (Sonja Ziemann), and he persuades her to accompany him to Budapest. Once there, Reynolds is kidnapped by "freedom fighters" who take him to the professor's secret headquarters.

Meanwhile, one of Jansci's trusted aides is captured by the Hungarian Secret Police and forced to reveal the professor's hiding place. Reynolds, Julia, and Jansci are quickly rounded up and taken to Szarhaza Prison, where they are tortured by the sadistic Colonel Hidas (Howard Vernon).

They are rescued by a resistance fighter known as The Count (Charles Régnier), who tricks the Communists into placing the prisoners in his custody. At the last moment the ruse is discovered. The Count is killed as the other three race to the airport where a chartered plane is waiting. Hidas pursues them but is killed in an accident on the runway. Safe at last, Reynolds, Julia, and the professor leave Hungary.

Cast
 Richard Widmark as Michael Reynolds
 Sonja Ziemann as Julia
 Charles Régnier as The Count
 Walter Rilla as Jancsi
 Senta Berger as Elsa
 Howard Vernon as Colonel Hidas
 Heinz Moog as Minister Sakenov
 Hubert von Meyerinck as Sheffler
 Oskar Wegrostek as The Fat man
 Stefan Schnabel as Border official
 Elisabeth Neumann-Viertel as Olga
 Helmut Janatsch as Janos  
 John Horsley as Jon Brainbridge  
 Walter Wilz as Peter 
 Raoul Retzer as Special Agent
 Georg Köváry as Language Professor
 Ady Berber as Sandor
 Jochen Brockmann as The Commandant
 Brigitte Brunmüller as Waitress
 Reinhard Kolldehoff as The Count's Men
 Rudolf Rösner as The Count's Men

Production
The film was based on Alistair MacLean's novel The Last Frontier which was published in the US as The Secret Ways.

Actor Richard Widmark moved into producing in the 1950s while  making Time Limit. His production company, Heath Films, bought the screen rights in March 1959. Widmark called it "an anti-Communist thing" which "had nothing to do with my [personal] politics."

In August 1959 Heath Films signed a two-picture deal with Universal, the first of which was to be The Secret Ways. Other books Widmark wanted to film were The Wounds of Hunder and The Seven File.

Widmark visited Austria with his wife Jean Hazlewood, who would write the script. They did considerable research and made a significant number of changes to the novel.

In May 1960 Phil Karlson signed to direct. Karlson went to Vienna on June 1, and filming began in August. Many local Austrian actors were cast in support roles.

Shooting
According to an interview in Cinema Retro, associate producer Euan Lloyd stated that producer and star Richard Widmark did not like director Phil Karlson's proposed tongue-in-cheek direction of the screenplay written by Widmark's wife Jean Hazlewood. Widmark took over the direction of the film in September without credit.

Karlson says Widmark hired him on the basis of The Phenix City Story because "he wanted to try to get realism in it" and the director told him "I wanted to do it as a James Bond. But he hadn't heard of James Bond. I said, "If we do this tongue in cheek, we'll be the first ones." He said, "No, I don't want to do it that way"." Karlson says he left for the last week of filming.  Years later, after Karlson made The Silencers, a Bond-style spoof, he says Widmark tried to get him to do three more pictures. The director said, "He realized we'd have had, maybe, the first picture that would have taken him out of the role of the guy who kicks the old lady down the steps."

Widmark had a series of movies in development as a proposed follow-up.

References

External links
 
 
 
 
 Movie review at AlistairMacLean.com

1961 films
1960s adventure thriller films
1961 adventure films
American black-and-white films
Cold War films
Films scored by John Williams
Films based on British novels
Films based on works by Alistair MacLean
Films set in 1960
Films set in Austria
Films set in Budapest
Films set in Hungary
Films set in Vienna
Universal Pictures films
Films directed by Phil Karlson
American adventure thriller films
1960s English-language films
1960s American films